Douglas Arlin Dawson (born December 27, 1961) is a former American college and professional football player who was an offensive lineman in the National Football League (NFL) for eleven seasons in the 1980s and 1990s.  Dawson played college football for the University of Texas, and received All-American honors and was an Academic All-American as a senior.  Thereafter, he played professionally for the St. Louis Cardinals, Houston Oilers, and Cleveland Browns of the NFL.

Biography 
Dawson was born in Houston, Texas. He graduated from Memorial High School. He attended the University of Texas in Austin, Texas, where he was an offensive lineman for the Texas Longhorns football team from 1980 to 1983 and was a team co-captain. He was recognized as a consensus first-team All-American as a senior in 1983.  He was also honored as a member of the university's Friar Society.

He subsequently played four seasons for the Houston Oilers (–) and his final season for the Cleveland Browns. He played in a total of 106 NFL games, and started 70 of them.

He has built a successful 30+ year career as a wealth management advisor in the Houston area for Northwestern Mutual Wealth Management Company where he ranks in the company's top 20 all-time.

References 

1961 births
Living people
All-American college football players
American football offensive linemen
Cleveland Browns players
Houston Oilers players
Sportspeople from Houston
St. Louis Cardinals (football) players
Texas Longhorns football players
Players of American football from Houston
Memorial High School (Hedwig Village, Texas) alumni